Udayana Warmadewa, also Dharmmodayana Warmadewa, was a king of the island of Bali in the 10th century. He belongs to the Warmadewa dynasty. He was married to the Javanese queen Mahendradatta, also known as Gunapriyadharmapatni. Their son was the famous Airlangga, who replaced the overthrown emperor of Java Dharmawangsa, and ruled in both Java and his original home of Bali.

Legacy 
Udayana is known as one of the earliest historical figure of ancient Bali. His identification as the father of the famous Airlangga, the hero-king of Java, has led him to be the prominence figure in Balinese history in par with ancient Java. As the result his name is associated with Balinese past greatness. In 1962 the Udayana University, a public university was established in Denpasar, Bali, Indonesia. The university's name was derived from this king. Also, the Indonesian Army named their Bali-based Military Command Region (Kodam), in his honor, the Kodam IX/Udayana.

Notes

References
 Willard A. Hanna (2004). Bali Chronicles. Periplus, Singapore. .

History of Bali
Monarchs of Bali
10th-century Indonesian people